Marie-Laure Gaillot (born 3 April 1943) is a French former swimmer. She competed in two events at the 1960 Summer Olympics.

References

External links
 

1943 births
Living people
French female freestyle swimmers
Olympic swimmers of France
Swimmers at the 1960 Summer Olympics
Swimmers from Paris